The Yukon Regiment was a short lived infantry regiment of the Canadian Army Reserve, currently on the Supplementary Order of Battle. The regiment originated in Whitehorse, Yukon on 19 March 1962, when 'The Yukon Regiment' was authorized to be formed. It was reduced to nil strength and transferred to the Supplementary Order of Battle on 15 June 1968.

Cap Badge

Description 
On a maple leaf Gules the Crest of the Yukon Territory (On a wreath Or and Gules, a husky dog standing on a mount of snow proper) all above a scroll Argent inscribed THE YUKON REGIMENT in letters Sable.

Symbolism 
The badge combines the red maple leaf of Canada, with a widely known official emblem of the Territory.

References 

Infantry regiments of Canada
Military units and formations established in 1962
Military units and formations disestablished in 1968
Supplementary Order of Battle
Military units and formations of Northern Canada